Gestigon  (stylized as gestigon) is a software development company founded in September 2011 by Sascha Klement, Erhardt Barth, and Thomas Martinetz. The company develops software for gesture control and body tracking based on 3D depth data.

, Gestigon is developing augmented reality and automotive solutions for Audi, Renault and Volkswagen. The company is also working on AR/VR headsets as well as consumer electronics and smart home devices.

In March 2017, Gestigon was acquired by Valeo, a French automotive supplier.

History
Sascha Klement worked as a student assistant and Ph.D. student for the professors Thomas Martinetz and Erhardt Barth, who have been developing software solutions based on time-of-flight sensors at the University of Lübeck since 2002. Together they founded Gestigon in 2011 with seed-funding from High-Tech Gründerfonds, Mittelständische Beteiligungsgesellschaft Schleswig-Holstein and local business angels.

In March 2012 Moritz von Grotthuss joined the company as advisor and later became CEO, being considered a late-founder. The same month, Gestigon received an Innovation Award at CeBIT 2012, being one of the 15 startups to receive an award out of 276 candidates.

In January 2013, Gestigon participated at CES in Las Vegas and, later that year, also at TechCrunch Disrupt in New York City. The next year Visteon and Volkswagen used Gestigon's gestures solutions in their products presented at CES 2014 and CeBIT 2014 where it won the “CeBIT Innovation Award”.

Further public displays of Gestigon's technologies include Audi at CES 2015 and CES 2016; Volkswagen and Infineon. Gestigon launched its Virtual Reality solution Carnival at the TechCrunch Disrupt in San Francisco in September 2015 using an Oculus Rift and different depth sensors. The first demo using a mobile device was done at the CES 2015. Gestigon has partnered with several companies that develop hardware solutions, especially depth sensors, to provide sensing solutions. In 2015 Gestigon partnered with Inuitive, a 3D computer vision and image processors developer, to create a VR unit. The system was presented at CES 2016 assembled on an Oculus Rift development kit.

In July 2015, Gestigon closed its Series A financing round from with nbr technology ventures GmbH as a primary investor headed by Fabian von Kuenheim and High-Tech Gründerfonds and Vorwerk Direct Selling Ventures. Fabian von Kuenheim became chairman of the advisory board which was also composed of the German entrepreneur Holger G. Weiss and the French investor Gunnar Graef. In March 2017, Gestigon was acquired by Valeo, a French automotive supplier. In March 2017, Gestion developed software that recognizes driving gestures.

Products
Gestigon develops software that works with 3D sensors to recognize human gestures, poses and biometrical features in real time, such as:

 Gecko, a feature tracker that tracks an individual and measures their biometric features,
 Flamenco, a piece of software for finger and hand gesture control,
 Carnival SDK, software for augmented reality and virtual reality, which allows users to see and use their hands in virtual interfaces.

Gestigon's solutions are based on skeleton recognition. Their software recognizes body parts in 3D data to make the recognition faster and more accurate. The software is sensor-agnostic and can work based on the data from any depth module using time-of-flight, stereo or structured light technologies.

References

Middleware
Virtual reality companies
Augmented reality
Software companies of Germany
Companies based in Schleswig-Holstein
Companies established in 2011
Gesture recognition
Software companies established in 2011
Companies based in Sunnyvale, California